The men's 10 metre platform, also reported as high diving, was one of four diving events on the diving at the 1936 Summer Olympics programme. For the first time, all dives were made exclusively from the 10 metre platform.

The competition was split into two sets of dives on separate days:

Compulsory dives (Friday, 14 August)
Divers performed four pre-chosen dives – a standing straight header forward, running straight header forward, standing straight somersault backward, and standing straight isander-half gainer. 
Facultative dives (Saturday, 15 August)
Divers performed four dives of their choice (from different categories and different from the compulsory).

Twenty-six divers from 15 nations competed.

Results

References

Sources
 
 

Men
1936
Men's events at the 1936 Summer Olympics